Gilmer George Robinson (April 18, 1910 – July 11, 1985) was an American football end who played one season with the Pittsburgh Pirates of the National Football League. He played college football at Catawba College and attended Spencer High School in Spencer, North Carolina.

References

External links
Just Sports Stats

1910 births
1985 deaths
Players of American football from North Carolina
American football ends
Catawba Indians football players
Pittsburgh Pirates (football) players
People from Spencer, North Carolina